The University Hospital St. Marina – Varna is a university hospital in Varna, Bulgaria.

The hospital has capacity of 1200 beds. It belongs to the Medical University of Varna.

External links
 Official website

Hospitals in Bulgaria
Medical University of Varna